Special Mission (French: Mission spéciale) is a 1946 French thriller film directed by Maurice de Canonge and starring Jany Holt, Pierre Renoir and Jean Davy. The film's art direction was by Claude Bouxin. It was released in two parts.

Cast
 Jany Holt as Emmy de Welder - une espionne au service des Allemands  
 Pierre Renoir as Landberg alias Moravetz - le chef du réseau d'espionnage allemand  
 Jean Davy as Le commissaire Chabrier - un policier de la Surveillance du Territoire 
 Odette Barencey as Une concierge  
 Camille Bert 
 Roger Bontemps 
 Yves Brainville as Le gestionnaire  
 André Carnège as Le contrôleur général 
 Gregori Chmara 
 Raymond Cordy as Mérignac - un policier de l'équipe de Chabrier  
 Marcel Delaître as Le colonel Kleider  
 Maurice Devienne 
 Jacques Dubois 
 Ky Duyen as Chang - un agent de liaison japonais  
 France Ellys   
 Fernand Fabre   
 Guy Favières  
 Geno Ferny  
 Georges Flateau   
 Louis Florencie as Le chef de gare bègue 
 Jean Francel    
 Alain Gilbert as Le tuberculeux 
 Jean Giltène   
 Jérôme Goulven as Staub 
 René Hell    
 Jacques Henley  
 Jean Heuzé 
 Gaëtan Jor 
 Roger Karl as Roeckel alias Poldermann - un membre du réseau d'espionnage allemand  
 Maurice Lagrenée 
 Léo Lapara as Péroni 
 Jacques Lecour  
 Rudy Lenoir
 Maurice Marceau    
 Germaine Michel 
 Clary Monthal 
 Armand Morins 
 Nathalie Nattier as Wanda Vanska  
 Georges Paulais
 Roger Rafal 
 Raymone as Mademoiselle Cartier  
 François Richard 
 Jean-Jacques Rouff 
 Jacques Roussel as Carlos  
 Marcel Rouzé 
 Elisa Ruis as Irma  
 Maurice Salabert
 Robert Seller as Le directeur du 'Critérion' 
 Liliane Valais as Hélène de Moreuil - la fille d'un colonel, infirmière et résistante 
 Jean Vilmont 
 Janine Viénot
 Marcelle Worms 
 Yvonne Yma  
 Jean Yonnel as Jean Sartène - un industriel du pétrole patriote 
 Eugène Yvernès

References

Bibliography 
 Ulrike Siehlohr. Heroines Without Heroes: Reconstructing Female and National Identities in European Cinema, 1945-1951. A&C Black, 2000.

External links 
 

1946 films
1940s thriller films
French thriller films
1940s French-language films
Films directed by Maurice de Canonge
French black-and-white films
1940s French films